Gérald Larose (born October 24, 1945) is a Quebec activist, professor, and former President of the Confédération des syndicats nationaux labour union. He is currently head of the Conseil de la Souveraineté du Québec, a Quebec independence organization.

Larose defended Jacques Godbout's novel Une histoire américaine in Le Combat des livres, the French version of Canada Reads, broadcast on the radio of Société Radio-Canada in 2004. He was awarded the title of Patriote de l'année ("Patriot of the Year") by the Saint-Jean-Baptiste Society in 1996.

References

External link

1945 births
Living people
Trade unionists from Quebec
Academic staff of the Université du Québec à Montréal
Quebec sovereigntists